This is a list of properties and districts in Union County, Georgia that are listed on the National Register of Historic Places (NRHP).

Current listings

|}

References

Union
Union County, Georgia